Felicia Jane "Flick" Beatrix Drummond (born 16 June 1962) is a British Conservative Party politician. She has been the Member of Parliament (MP) for Meon Valley since 2019, having previously represented Portsmouth South from 2015 to 2017.

Political career
Drummond sat on Winchester City Council from 1996 to 2000, before leaving to accompany her husband to work in the United States. Having returned in 2004, Drummond was selected to stand for Parliament in Southampton Itchen in 2005, coming second to Labour's John Denham. In the 2015 general election, she succeeded the incumbent, Mike Hancock as Member of Parliament in Portsmouth South, having come second to him in the 2010 general election.

During the 2015 Parliament Drummond was a member of the Women and Equalities Select Committee. With Jess Phillips, she set up the Women and Work APPG which she currently co-chairs. She also established the Cybersecurity APPG.

Drummond campaigned to remain in the European Union in the 2016 Referendum. She stated in 2016 that the referendum result diminished and would lessen Britain's influence in Europe.

Drummond was defeated in a further marginal result at the 2017 general election, one of thirty net gains by the opposing Labour Party.

In October 2018, Drummond was elected Voluntary Director of the Conservative Policy Forum by the National Conservative Convention. In November 2019, Drummond was selected as the prospective parliamentary candidate for the safe Conservative seat of Meon Valley, in Eastern Hampshire. She returned to Parliament at the December 2019 general election after the incumbent George Hollingbery retired. She then stood down as the Conservative candidate to become the Hampshire Police and crime commissioner in the 2020 England and Wales police and crime commissioner elections.

Between February and September 2020 Drummond served as Parliamentary Private Secretary to Anne-Marie Trevelyan as Secretary of State for International Development before becoming PPS to Thérèse Coffey at the Department for Work and Pensions.

Since January 2021, Drummond has served as one of two vice-chairwomen of the Conservative European Forum, which replaced the Conservative Group for Europe. The group calls for close, strategic relationships with Europe, advocating for a close relationship with European institutions.

In October 2022, Drummond was appointed to the Commons Public Accounts Committee and the Education Select Committee.

In April 2023 she faces a reselection vote for the next general election. Under the 2023 Periodic Review of Westminster constituencies, her Meon Valley constituency is set to be dissolved and merged with Fareham to form "Fareham and Waterlooville". Her opponent is Home Secretary and Fareham MP Suella Braverman.

She is currently Chair of APPGs on Wine of Great Britain, Women and Work, and Women, Peace and Security. She is co-chair of the APPG on Yemen.

Interests 
Flick Drummond is particularly interested in education policy and foreign affairs, in particular the Middle East. Drummond is a graduate of the Royal College of Defence Studies and has completed two terms on the Armed Forces Parliamentary Scheme.

Personal life 
Drummond is married with four children. Before entering politics Drummond was a lay inspector for Ofsted. Drummond has also served as Chair of Governors at Milton Park Primary School and a trustee of Salterns Academy Trust in Portsmouth.

Publications
No Blame Game - The Future for Children's Social Workers for the Conservative Party Commission on Social Workers (October 2007)
Women Returners, Annual report for Women and Work APPG (2016)
Brexit and Beyond edited by George Freeman MP – chapter on Coastal Communities (2019)
The Future of Education, One Nation Conservatives (2020)

References

External links

 

1962 births
Living people
20th-century English women politicians
21st-century English women politicians
Conservative Party (UK) MPs for English constituencies
English expatriates in the United States
Female members of the Parliament of the United Kingdom for English constituencies
People from Aden
People educated at Roedean School, East Sussex
Politicians from Portsmouth
Politicians from Winchester
UK MPs 2015–2017
UK MPs 2019–present
Women councillors in England